Heteropelta is an extinct genus of archosauriform, possibly a basal archosauriform, basal phytosaur or a suchian archosaur. It is known from a single species, Heteropelta boboi, which was found in the Middle Triassic Torbiditi d’Aupa Formation in Italy. The holotype is listed as specimen MFSN 46485 and was collected after 2006.

References 

Prehistoric archosauriforms
Prehistoric reptile genera
Anisian genera
Middle Triassic reptiles of Europe
Triassic Italy
Fossils of Italy
Fossil taxa described in 2021